Yellow Pearl may refer to:

 Yellow Pearl (album), a compilation album by Phil Lynott
 "Yellow Pearl", a song by Phil Lynott from Solo in Soho
 Yellow Pearl, an Asian-American folk music group of the 1970s as well as the name of one of their songs on their 1973 album A Grain of Sand: Music for the Struggle by Asians in America.  See Chris Iijima.

See also 
 Yellow Peril